Shiva Negar (born May 29, 1983) is an Iranian-Canadian actress and model, who rose to prominence starring as Annika Ogden in CBS Films/Lionsgate Blockbuster Movie "American Assassin" and made the short list of Variety Magazine's "10 Canadians to watch".

Her first feature was a supporting role in the film Lost Journey. Other significant acting credits include the action thriller American Assassin, Becoming Burlesque, and television shows My Babysitter's a Vampire, Heartland, Seal Team, and The Cleaning Lady. Born in Iran, and raised in Turkey and Canada, Shiva started her career as a child, performing at piano and guitar recitals and in singing competitions. Shiva was involved in several school plays and theatre during high school, which led her to focus on acting. She graduated from York University with a degree in Psychology and finished her Post-graduate program in Events Management & Marketing.

Filmography

Film

Television

References

External links

 

Shiva Negar on Instagram

Actresses from Toronto
Canadian film actresses
Canadian people of Iranian descent
Canadian television actresses
Living people
Iranian female models
1989 births
Iranian actresses